The Way of Georgia (also called The Georgian Way) was a political party in Georgia. It was registered on March 11, 2006. The party was led by former Foreign Minister and current President Salome Zourabichvili from its founding until 2010. The Way of Georgia was considered a liberal party.

Although Zourabichvili enjoyed high personal popularity, her party has not been able to establish itself in the political field. At the city council elections in Tbilisi on October 5, 2006, only 2.77% of the constituency voted for the party. On June 20, 2019, party was merged into new party, For a Justice.

See also
Liberalism
List of political parties in Georgia
Politics of Georgia (country)
Rose Revolution
Mikheil Saakashvili

References

External links
Zourabichvili Gears Up for Politics
Georgia on Europe’s Mind - Article Written By Zourabichvili On Need For European Assistance (March 2006)

2006 establishments in Georgia (country)
Liberal parties in Georgia (country)
Political parties established in 2006
Political parties in Georgia (country)